The Jeanneau Love Love is a French trailerable sailboat that was designed by Philippe Harlé as a coastal cruiser and first built in 1971.

The design was developed into the raised deck Jeanneau Brio in 1979.

Production
The design was built by Jeanneau in France, from 1971 until 1979, with 780 boats completed, but it is now out of production.

Design
The Love Love is a recreational keelboat, built predominantly of fiberglass, with wood trim. It has a masthead sloop rig, with a deck-stepped mast, one set of straight spreaders and aluminum spars with stainless steel wire rigging. The hull has a raked stem, a slightly reverse transom, a skeg-mounted rudder controlled by a tiller and a fixed swept fin keel. It displaces  and carries  of ballast.

The boat is normally fitted with a small outboard motor for docking and maneuvering.

The design has sleeping accommodation for four people, with a double "V"-berth in the bow cabin and two straight settee berths in the main cabin. The galley is located on the starboard side just forward of the companionway ladder and slides aft under the cockpit when not in use. The galley is equipped with a single-burner stove and a sink. The head is located just aft of the bow cabin on the port side and includes a shower. There are two heads, one just aft of the bow cabin on the port side and one on the starboard side in the aft cabin.

See also
List of sailing boat types

References

External links

Keelboats
1970s sailboat type designs
Sailing yachts
Trailer sailers
Sailboat type designs by Philippe Harlé
Sailboat types built by Jeanneau